The molecular formula C22H24N2O8 (molar mass: 444.43 g/mol, exact mass: 444.1533 u) may refer to:

 Tetracycline
 Doxycycline

Molecular formulas